Rosa Gwenny Griffiths (25 June 1867 – 22 December 1953) was a Welsh artist known for her portrait and flower paintings.

Biography
Griffiths was born in the Druslyn area of Swansea in south Wales and attended Swansea Art School before studying at the Slade School of Art in London where she was taught by Alphonse Legros. After graduating from the Slade, Griffiths then studied in Paris at the Académie Julian and the Académie Colarossi. She first exhibited in London in 1892 with the Society of British Artists, showing a painting titled Madame Chrysantheme, and then regularly at the Royal Academy and the Royal Society of Portrait Painters. On occasion she showed works in Budapest at the Salon Nemzeti and in 1914 had works shown at the Paris Salon. Griffiths was a member of the Women's International Art Club and during 1906 and 1907 served as the club's honorary secretary. She had a solo exhibition at the Glynn Vivian Art Gallery in Swansea in 1922. Griffiths painted a number of notable portraits. Her subjects included Dame Margaret Lloyd George, Lord Justice Banks, the Viscountess Hawarden and the trustees of Swansea Hospital. For a time Griffiths lived in Cannes but spent the duration of World War II in Wales and then returned to France when the conflict ended.

She died in Cannes on 22 December 1953, aged 86.

References

External links

1867 births
1953 deaths
19th-century Welsh painters
19th-century Welsh women artists
20th-century Welsh painters
20th-century Welsh women artists
Académie Colarossi alumni
Alumni of Swansea Metropolitan University
Académie Julian alumni
Alumni of the Slade School of Fine Art
Artists from Swansea
Welsh women painters